The 1982 California Angels season involved the Angels finishing 1st in the American League West for the second time in team history, with a record of 93 wins and 69 losses. However, the Angels fell to the Milwaukee Brewers in the ALCS in 5 games. This was future Hall of Famer Reggie Jackson’s first season with the Angels.

Offseason 
 December 6, 1981: Bob Boone was purchased by the Angels from the Philadelphia Phillies.
 December 7, 1981: José Moreno was selected by the Angels from the San Diego Padres in the rule 5 draft.
 December 8, 1981: Dave Smith was selected by the Angels from the New York Mets in the minor league draft.
 December 11, 1981: Brian Harper was traded by the Angels to the Pittsburgh Pirates for Tim Foli.
 January 22, 1982: Reggie Jackson was signed as a free agent by the California Angels.
 January 28, 1982: Dan Ford was traded by the California Angels to the Baltimore Orioles for Doug DeCinces and Jeff Schneider.

Regular season 
 April 27, 1982: Reggie Jackson returned to Yankee Stadium with the Angels. He broke out of a terrible season-starting slump to hit a home run off former teammate Ron Guidry. The at-bat began with Yankee fans, angry at owner George Steinbrenner for letting Jackson get away, starting the "Reg-GIE!" chant, and ended it with the fans chanting "Steinbrenner sucks!" By the time of Jackson's election to the Hall of Fame, Steinbrenner had begun to say that letting him go was the biggest mistake he has made as Yankee owner.

Season standings

Record vs. opponents

Transactions 
 April 11, 1982: Ron Jackson was signed as a free agent with the California Angels.
 May 12, 1982: Tom Brunansky, Mike Walters, and $400,000 were traded by the Angels to the Minnesota Twins for Doug Corbett and Rob Wilfong.
 August 2, 1982: Luis Tiant was purchased by the Angels from Tabasco of the Mexican League.
 August 31, 1982: The Angels traded a player to be named later to the New York Yankees for Tommy John. The Angels completed the trade by sending Dennis Rasmussen to the Yankees on November 24.

Roster

Player stats

Batting

Starters by position 
Note: Pos = Position; G = Games played; AB = At bats; H = Hits; Avg. = Batting average; HR = Home runs; RBI = Runs batted in

Other batters 
Note: G = Games played; AB = At bats; H = Hits; Avg. = Batting average; HR = Home runs; RBI = Runs batted in

Pitching

Starting pitchers 
Note: G = Games pitched; IP = Innings pitched; W = Wins; L = Losses; ERA = Earned run average; SO = Strikeouts

Other pitchers 
Note: G = Games pitched; IP = Innings pitched; W = Wins; L = Losses; ERA = Earned run average; SO = Strikeouts

Relief pitchers 
Note: G = Games pitched; W = Wins; L = Losses; SV = Saves; ERA = Earned run average; SO = Strikeouts

Game log

|-

|-
|- style="background:#bbb;"
|—|| May 24 || || @ Red Sox || colspan=9 | Postponed (Rain); Makeup: August 26

|-

|-

|-
|- style="background:#bbb;"
|—|| August 9 || || @ Twins || colspan=9 | Postponed (Schedule change); Makeup: August 12

|-

|-

|- style="text-align:center;"
| Legend:       = Win       = Loss       = PostponementBold = Angels team member

ALCS

Game log 

|-
|- style="background:#cfc;"
| 1 || October 5 || 5:25 p.m. PDT || Brewers || 8–3 || John (1–0) || Caldwell (0–1) || – || 64,406 || 1–0 || W1
|- style="background:#cfc;"
| 2 || October 6 || 5:15 p.m. PDT || Brewers || 4–2 || Kison (1–0) || Vuckovich (0–1) || – || 64,179 || 2–0 || W2
|- style="background:#fbb;"
| 3 || October 8 || 12:15 p.m. PDT || @ Brewers || 3–5 || Sutton (1–0) || Zahn (0–1) || Ladd (1) || 50,135 || 2–1 || L1
|- style="background:#fbb;"
| 4 || October 9 || 10:00 a.m. PDT || @ Brewers || 5–9 || Haas (1–0) || John (1–1) || Slaton (1) || 51,003 || 2–2 || L2
|- style="background:#fbb;"
| 5 || October 10 || 1:20 p.m. PDT || @ Brewers || 3–4 || McClure (1–0) || Sánchez (0–1) || Ladd (2) || 54,968 || 2–3 || L3

|- style="text-align:center;"
| Legend:       = Win       = Loss       = PostponementBold = Angels team member

Game 1, October 5 

Anaheim Stadium, Anaheim, California

Game 2, October 6 

Anaheim Stadium, Anaheim, California

Game 3, October 8 

County Stadium, Milwaukee, Wisconsin

Game 4, October 9 

County Stadium, Milwaukee, Wisconsin

Game 5, October 10 

County Stadium, Milwaukee, Wisconsin

Awards and honors 
 Fred Lynn, American League Championship Series Most Valuable Player
 Reggie Jackson OF, American League Leader Home Runs (39)
All-Star Game
 Rod Carew
 Bobby Grich (starting 2B)
 Reggie Jackson (starting RF)
 Fred Lynn (starting CF)

Farm system 

LEAGUE CHAMPIONS: Salem

Notes

References

External links 
1982 California Angels at Baseball Reference
1982 California Angels  at Baseball Almanac

Los Angeles Angels seasons
American League West champion seasons
Los